Ghana is third in a three-part series of compilations of songs by The Mountain Goats that have appeared on various releases. It is preceded by Protein Source of the Future...Now!, and Bitter Melon Farm.

Track listing

Personnel
 John Darnielle - Vocals, acoustic guitar
 Rachel Ware - Bass guitar, backing vocals (2, 5, 6, 11, 21, 30)
 Alastair Galbraith - Violin, etc. (7-10)

Cover versions
 Michael and the G2s cover "Going to Port Washington" in their album Michael and the G2s Cover Everything.

References

The Mountain Goats compilation albums
1999 compilation albums